Ottavio Panunzi (14 February 1933 – 5 March 2016) was an Italian boxer. He competed in the men's light heavyweight event at the 1956 Summer Olympics.

References

1933 births
2016 deaths
Italian male boxers
Olympic boxers of Italy
Boxers at the 1956 Summer Olympics
Boxers from Rome
Light-heavyweight boxers